Julius Duboc (October 10, 1829 Hamburg - June 11, 1903) was a German author and philosopher.

Biography
He studied at Giessen, Leipzig and Berlin, and became a disciple of Ludwig Feuerbach.

Works
Evolutionary monism, atheism and the doctrine that pleasure is the end of all human activity find expression in his works, which include:
 Soziale Briefe (“Letters on society,” 3rd ed. 1873)
 Geschichte der Englischen Presse (“History of the English press,” 1873)
 Die Psychologie der Liebe (“The psychology of love,” 1874)
 Das Leben ohne Gott, Untersuchungen über den ethischen Gehalt des Atheismus (“Life without God, studies on the ethical content of atheism,” 1875)
 Gegen den Strom (“Against the tide,” a collection of his earlier essays, 1877)
 Der Optimismus als Weltanschauung (“Optimism as a way of looking at the world,” 1881)
 Hundert Jahre Zeitgeist in Deutschland (“A hundred years of the spirit of the times in Germany,” 1889)
 Jenseits von Wirklichen (“On the other side from reality,” 1896)
 Die Lust als sozialethisches Entwicklungsprinzip (“Desire as a principle of social development,” 1900)
 Fünfzig Jahre Frauenfrage in Deutschland (“Fifty years of the woman question in Germany,” a collection of essays)

References 
 
 

19th-century German philosophers
1829 births
1903 deaths
German male writers